Stewart Dunlop (born 1946) was a politician from Northern Ireland.

Dunlop was a founder member of the Protestant Unionist Party and subsequently its successor the Democratic Unionist Party (DUP). He was a member of the Northern Ireland Constitutional Convention for South Antrim. He served as a member of Antrim Borough Council, being elected in 1977, 1981, 1985 and 1989.

References

1946 births
Living people
Members of the Northern Ireland Constitutional Convention
Democratic Unionist Party politicians
Members of Antrim Borough Council